Virus is the fourth full-length album by French power metal band Heavenly. It was released on 21 September 2006 via Avalon Records.

Track listing
All songs by Benjamin Sotto, except "The Joker" by Charley Corbiaux.

Personnel
Benjamin Sotto – vocals, keyboards
Thomas Das Neves – drums
Olivier Lapauze – guitar
Matthieu Plana – bass
Charley Corbiaux – guitar, vocals on tracks 7 and 10

Guest musicians 
Tanja Lainio (Lullacry) - vocals on track 8
Kevin Codfert (Adagio) - keyboards on track 6
Tony Kakko (Sonata Arctica) - vocals on track 5
Oliver Rengshausen - strings

2006 albums
Heavenly (French band) albums
AFM Records albums
Albums with cover art by Jean-Pascal Fournier